Paton Township is a township in Greene County, Iowa, USA.

History
Paton Township was established in 1875.

References

Townships in Greene County, Iowa
Townships in Iowa
1875 establishments in Iowa
Populated places established in 1875